Tuva, a federal subject of Russia, has competed in the Turkvision Song Contest three times. Participants representing Tuva entered the semi-finals in the 2013 and 2014 contests, but no participants from Tuva entered in 2015. They returned to the contest in 2020.

History
Tuva made their debut in the Turkvision Song Contest at the  contest in Eskişehir, Turkey. Saylık Ommun represented Tuva with the song "Çavıdak", composed by Salim Sarık-Ool and written by Anonim. Tuva did not qualify from the semi-final held on 19 December.

Tuva had internally selected Ayas Kullar to represent them at the  contest. The Tuvan delegation arrived for the contest 1 day before the semi-final and were drawn to perform 25th. They placed 20th with 151 points.

Tuva had selected Arjaana Stal-ool with the song "Tuvam" for the  contest to be held in Istanbul, Turkey. However, Tuva withdrew from the contest in November 2015 due to the deterioration of relations between Russia and Turkey after a Turkish fighter jet shot down a Russian attack aircraft. Vladimir Medinsky, Minister of Culture of Russia, had sent a telegram to the Head of the Republic of Tuva asking that Tuva cease cooperation with Türksoy, the contest organisers. Vera Lapshakova, Deputy Minister of Culture of Tuva, stated that the republic had no joint plans with Türksoy at the time.

Participation overview

See also
 Russia in the Turkvision Song Contest

References 

Countries in the Turkvision Song Contest
Turkvision